Avenhorn is a village in the Dutch province of North Holland. It is a part of the municipality of Koggenland, and lies about 9 km west of Hoorn.

History 
The village was first mentioned around 1312 as Lutekedrecht. The current name means "corner (of a dike) of Ave (person)". Avenhorn developed in the 13th century as a peat excavation settlement.

The Dutch Reformed church is a single aisled church from 1642. In 1914, a ridge turret was added to the church.

Avenhorn was home to 364 people in 1840. In 1884, a railway station was opened on the Zaandam to Enkhuizen railway line. It closed in 1940. In 1979, the former municipality of Avenhorn merged into the new municipality of Wester-Koggenland. In 2007, it became part of the municipality of Koggenland.

Gallery

References

Former municipalities of North Holland
Populated places in North Holland
Koggenland